Marion McCorry (born October 10, 1945) is an American film and television actress.

McCorry was born in New York City. She has studied with Uta Hagen, and has taught at HB Studio in New York City for several years.

References

External links

1945 births
Actresses from New York City
American film actresses
American television actresses
Living people
21st-century American women